Niko Palonen is a Finnish professional ice hockey forward who currently plays for Ässät of the SM-liiga.

References

External links

Living people
Ässät players
1989 births
Finnish ice hockey forwards
Sportspeople from Pori